Voter impersonation, also sometimes called in-person voter fraud, is a form of electoral fraud in which a person who is eligible to vote in an election votes more than once, or a person who is not eligible to vote does so by voting under the name of an eligible voter. In the United States, voter ID laws have been enacted in a number of states by Republican legislatures and governors since 2010 with the purported aim of preventing voter impersonation. Existing research and evidence shows that voter impersonation is extremely rare. Between 2000 and 2014, there were only 31 documented instances of voter impersonation. There is no evidence that it has changed the result of any election. In April 2020, a voter fraud study covering 20 years by the Massachusetts Institute of Technology found the level of mail-in ballot fraud "exceedingly rare" since it occurs only in "0.00006 percent" of individual votes nationally, and, in one state, "0.000004 percent — about five times less likely than getting hit by lightning in the United States."

Voter ID laws

Voter ID laws target "in-person" voting fraud to deter impersonation by requiring some form of official ID. In many states, voters have other options besides  "in-person" voting, such as absentee voting, or requesting an absentee ballot (which includes online voting and voting by mail).
 Absentee voting fraud, for example, is not "deterred by ID laws".

A 2015 article by University of Virginia Law School's Michael Gilbert in the Columbia Law Review described how voter ID laws are controversial in the United States in terms of both politics and public law. Gilbert contends that voter ID laws "increase the risk of vote fraud". Those who support voter ID claim to want to protect election integrity by preventing voter fraud. Opponents claim that voter ID laws, "like poll taxes and literacy tests before them, intentionally depress turnout by lawful voters." Critics of voter ID laws have argued that voter impersonation is illogical from the perspective of the perpetrator, as if they are caught, they will face harsh criminal penalties, including up to 5 years in prison and a fine of up to $10,000 for citizens and possible deportation for non-citizens. Even if they are not caught, they will have cast only one vote for their candidate.

It would be very difficult for someone to coordinate widespread voter impersonation to steal an election. Even if they paid people to vote for their preferred candidate, they could not confirm whether the people they paid voted at all, much less the way they were paid to.

The strictest voter ID law in the United States is Senate Bill 14, which was signed by the Governor of Texas Rick Perry in 2011 and came into effect on January 1, 2012, although it was blocked a few months later. It was reinstated in 2013, but was later found to be discriminatory against minorities in a July 2015 U.S. 5th Circuit Court of Appeals ruling. A lower court was required to develop a fix for the law before the November 2016 elections. Jeff Sessions dropped challenges against Senate Bill 14 early in his tenure at the Department of Justice.

Estimates of frequency
The vast majority of voter ID laws in the United States target only voter impersonation, of which there are only 31 documented cases in the United States from the 2000–2014 period. According to PolitiFact, "in-person voter fraud—the kind targeted by the ID law—remains extremely rare". According to the Associated Press, the New York Times, NPR, CNBC, the Guardian, and FactCheck.Org, the available research and evidence point to the type of fraud that would be prevented by voter ID laws as "very rare" or "extremely rare". PolitiFact finds the suggestion that "voter fraud is rampant" false, giving it its "Pants on Fire" rating.

ABC News reported in 2012 that only four cases of voter impersonation had led to convictions in Texas over the previous decade. A study released the same year by News21, an Arizona State University reporting project, identified a total of 10 cases of alleged voter impersonation in the United States since 2000. The same study found that for every case of voter impersonation, there were 207 cases of other types of election fraud. This analysis has, in turn, been criticized by the executive director of the Republican National Lawyers Association, who has said that the study was "highly flawed in its very approach to the issue." Also a 2012 study found no evidence that voter impersonation (in the form of people voting under the auspices of a dead voter) occurred in the 2006 Georgia general elections.

In April 2014, Federal District Court Judge Lynn Adelman ruled in Frank v. Walker that Wisconsin's voter ID law was unconstitutional because "virtually no voter impersonation occurs in Wisconsin ...". In August 2014, Justin Levitt, a professor at Loyola Law School, reported in the Washington Post's Wonkblog that he had identified only 31 credible cases of voter impersonation since 2000. Levitt has also claimed that of these 31 cases, three of them occurred in Texas, while Lorraine Minnite of Rutgers University–Camden estimates there were actually four during the 2000–2014 period. The most serious incident identified involved as many as 24 people trying to vote under assumed names in Brooklyn, but even this would not have made a significant difference in almost any American election. Also that year, a study in the Election Law Journal found that about the same percentage of the U.S. population (about 2.5%) admitted to having been abducted by aliens as admitted to committing voter impersonation. This study also concluded that "strict voter ID requirements address a problem that was certainly not common in the 2012 U.S. election." In 2016, News21 reviewed cases of possible voter impersonation in five states where politicians had expressed concerns about it. They found 38 successful fraud cases in these states from 2012 to 2016, none of which were for voter impersonation.

Outdated voter registration

Based on 2008 data in the 2012 Pew report,

In 2012 NPR published figures related to the Pew study claiming that over 1.8 million dead people were registered to vote nationwide and over 3 million voters were registered in multiple states. However, the PEW study to which the article referred had concluded that the "millions of out of date registration records due to people moving or dying" had "found no evidence that voter fraud resulted."

Pew researchers found that military personnel were disproportionately affected by voter registration errors. Most often these involved members of the military and their families who were deployed overseas. For example, in 2008 alone, they reported almost "twice as many registration problems" as the general public.

In an October 2016 article published in Business Insider, the author noted these voter registration irregularities left some people concerned that the electoral system was vulnerable to the impersonation of dead voters. However, registration irregularities do not intrinsically constitute fraud: in most cases the states are simply slow to eliminate ineligible voters. By 2016, most states had addressed concerns raised by the Pew 2012 report.

Reporting and investigation 
The New York Times reported that 18 of the 36 people arrested were charged with absentee ballot fraud - which is not voter impersonation - in the 1997 Miami mayoral election.

According to a Newsday report in 2013, since 2000, there had been 270 cases of 6,000 dead people previously registered to vote in Nassau County, NY, who supposedly cast ballots at some point after their deaths. However, the paper explained: "The votes attributed to the dead are too few, and spread over 20 elections since 2000, to consider them a coordinated fraud attempt. More likely is what investigators in other states have found when examining dead voter records: Clerical errors are to blame, such as a person's vote being assigned to a dead person with a similar name."

In October 2020, Republican election lawyer Benjamin Ginsberg wrote:
I spent four decades in the Republican trenches, representing GOP presidential and congressional campaigns, working on Election Day operations, recounts, redistricting and other issues, including trying to lift the consent decree.... Nearly every Election Day since 1984 I've worked with Republican poll watchers, observers and lawyers to record and litigate any fraud or election irregularities discovered.
The truth is that over all those years Republicans found only isolated incidents of fraud. Proof of systematic fraud has become the Loch Ness Monster of the Republican Party. People have spent a lot of time looking for it, but it doesn't exist.

Pew report (2012)
Some alleging voter fraud have cited a 2012 report by the Pew Center on the States titled "Inaccurate, Costly, and Inefficient: Evidence That America's Voter Registration System Needs an Upgrade", which was based on data collected in 2008. However, the study was misinterpreted. As explained by PolitiFact, the study investigated "outdated voter rolls, not fraudulent votes", and made "no mention of noncitizens voting or registering to vote". Pew's election program director also clarified: "We found millions of out of date registration records due to people moving or dying, but found no evidence that voter fraud resulted."

Old Dominion University study (2014)

Proponents of voter ID laws have pointed to a 2014 study by Old Dominion University professors Jesse Richman and David Earnest as justification. The study, which used data developed by the Cooperative Congressional Election Study, concluded that more than 14 percent of self-identified non-citizens in 2008 and 2010 indicated that they were registered to vote, approximately 6.4% of surveyed non-citizens voted in 2008, and 2.2% of surveyed non-citizens voted in 2010. However, the study also concluded that voter ID requirements would be ineffective at reducing non-citizen voting. This study has been criticized by numerous academics. A 2015 study by the managers of the Cooperative Congressional Election Study found that Richman and Earnest's study was "almost certainly flawed" and that, in fact, it was most likely that 0% of non-citizens had voted in recent American elections. Richman and Earnest's findings were the result of measurement error; some individuals who answered the survey checked the wrong boxes in surveys. Richman and Earnest therefore extrapolated from a handful of wrongfully classified cases to achieve an exaggerated number of individuals who appeared to be non-citizen voters. Richman later conceded that "the response error issues ... may have biased our numbers". Richman has also rebuked President Trump for claiming that millions voted illegally in 2016. Brian Schaffner, Professor of Political Science at University of Massachusetts, Amherst, who was part of the team that debunked Richman and Earnest's study said that the study

University of California, San Diego, study (2017)

A 2017 study in The Journal of Politics "shows that strict identification laws have a differentially negative impact on the turnout of racial and ethnic minorities in primaries and general elections. Voter ID laws skew democracy in favor of whites and those on the political right" The results of this study were challenged in a paper by Stanford political scientist Justin Grimmer and four other political scientists. The paper says that the findings in the aforementioned study "a product of data inaccuracies, the presented evidence does not support the stated conclusion, and alternative model specifications produce highly variable results. When errors are corrected, one can recover positive, negative, or null estimates of the effect of voter ID laws on turnout, precluding firm conclusions." In a response, the authors of the original study dismissed the aforementioned criticisms, and stood by the findings of the original article. Columbia University statistician and political scientist Andrew Gelman said that the response by the authors of the original study "did not seem convincing" and that the finding of racial discrepancies in the original study does not stand.

Fish v. Kobach (2018) 

Fish v. Kobach was a bench trial in United States District Court for the District of Kansas in which five Kansas residents and the League of Women Voters contested the legality of the Documentary Proof of Citizenship (DPOC) requirement of the Kansas Secure and Fair Elections (SAFE) Act, enacted in 2011,  which took effect in 2013.  Then-Kansas Secretary of State Kris Kobach claimed these procedures were needed to protect the nation from a supposedly massive problem of vote fraud by people not legally allowed to do so, including 11.3 percent of non-citizens residing in the US amounting to some 3.2 million votes in 2016, greater than Hillary Clinton's lead in the 2016 popular vote.

On June 18 and 19, 2018, Judge Robinson, appointed to the bench by Republican President George W. Bush, published 118 pages of “Findings of fact and conclusions of law” in this case. In broad strokes, she sided with the plaintiffs on most of the major points in question and with the defense on a few relatively minor points.

For example, “Defendant's expert Hans von Spakovsky is a senior legal fellow at The Heritage Foundation, 'a think tank whose mission [is to] formulate and promote conservative public policies. ... [He] cited a U.S. GAO study for the proposition that the GAO 'found that up to 3 percent of the 30,000 individuals called for jury duty from voter registration roles over a two-year period in just one U.S. district court were not U.S. citizens.' On cross-examination, however, he acknowledged that he omitted the following facts: the GAO study contained information on a total of 8 district courts; 4 of the 8 reported that there was not a single non-citizen who had been called for jury duty; and the 3 remaining district courts reported that less than 1% of those called for jury duty from voter rolls were noncitizens. Therefore, his report misleadingly described the only district court with the highest percentage of people reporting that they were noncitizens, while omitting mention of the 7 other courts described in the GAO report, including 4 that had no incidents of noncitizens on the rolls. ... In contrast, Plaintiffs offered Dr. Lorraine Minnite, an objective expert witness, who provided compelling testimony about Defendant's claims of noncitizen registration. Dr. Minnite ... has extensively researched and studied the incidence and effect of voter fraud in American elections. Her published research on the topic spans over a decade and includes her full-length, peer reviewed book, The Myth of Voter Fraud, ... .Dr. Minnite testified that when she began researching the issue of voter fraud, ..., she began with a 'blank slate' about the conclusions she would ultimately draw from the research. ... Although she admits that noncitizen registration and voting does at times occur, Dr. Minnite testified that there is no empirical evidence to support Defendant's claims in this case that noncitizen registration and voting in Kansas are largescale problems. ... [M]any of these cases reflect isolated incidents of avoidable administrative errors ... and / or misunderstanding on the part of applicants. ... For example, 100 individuals in ELVIS [the Kansas Election Voter Information System] have birth dates in the 1800s, indicating that they are older than 118. And 400 individuals have birth dates after their date of registration, indicating they registered to vote before they were born. ... The voting rate among purported noncitizen registrations on [a Kansas temporary drivers license] match list is around 1%, whereas the voting rate among registrants in Kansas more generally is around 70%.”

Judge Robinson saw no credible evidence to support the claims of substantive noncitizen voting, the key claim of the defendant.

History

In-person voter fraud (1968–1982)
Conservative lawyer Hans von Spakovsky has claimed that significant in-person voter fraud occurred in Brooklyn from 1968 to 1982, but Richard Hasen has argued that this fraud, because it involved election officials colluding with one another, could not have been prevented by a voter ID law.

Voter fraud claims in the 2016 presidential election
President Donald Trump claimed without evidence that between 3 and 5 million people cost him the popular vote to Hillary Clinton by voting illegally. He claimed that he narrowly lost to Hillary Clinton in 2016 in New Hampshire (and that Senator Kelly Ayotte also lost her bid for re-election in New Hampshire) because thousands of people were illegally bused there from Massachusetts. There is no evidence to support Trump's claims, which the New Hampshire Attorney General's Office determined were unfounded.

Trump claimed that "millions voted illegally in the election" based on "studies and evidence that people have presented him". At that time, CNN reported that Trump had based his fraud voter claims on information from Gregg Phillips, VoteStand founder. While members of Trump's cabinet and family were registered to vote in multiple states, this was considered to be oversight, not fraud. In response to Trump's allegations, On February 10, Ellen L. Weintraub, the Federal Election Commission (FEC) Commissioner, requested that Trump provide evidence of the "thousands of felony criminal offenses under New Hampshire law". In a CNN interview on February 12, Stephen Miller seemed to refer to the 2012 Pew Research Center (PEW) study but was unable at that time to support claims of voter fraud as evidence. There is no evidence to support Trump's assertion that there was substantial voter fraud in the 2016 election.

Voter fraud commission (2017)

On May 11, 2017, Trump signed an executive order to establish a voter fraud commission to conduct an investigation into voter fraud. He had announced his intention to create the commission on January 25. The commission's chairman was Vice President Mike Pence with Kris Kobach as vice chairman. Kobach, who is the Secretary of State of Kansas, calls for stricter voter ID laws in the United States. Kobach claims there is a voter fraud crisis in the United States. Trump's creation of the commission was criticized by voting rights advocates, scholars and experts, and newspaper editorial boards as a pretext for, and prelude to, voter suppression.

In January 2018, Trump abruptly disbanded the commission, which met only twice. The commission found no evidence of widespread voter fraud in the United States.

Voter fraud claims in the 2020 presidential election

During the 2020 presidential campaign, Trump indicated in Twitter posts, interviews and speeches that he might refuse to recognize the outcome of the election if he were defeated; Trump falsely suggested that the election would be rigged against him. Trump repeatedly claimed that "the only way" he could lose would be if the election was "rigged" and repeatedly refused to commit to a peaceful transition of power after the election. Trump also attacked mail-in voting throughout the campaign, falsely claiming that the practice contained high rates of fraud. In September 2020, FBI Director Christopher A. Wray, a Trump appointee, testified under oath that the FBI has "not seen, historically, any kind of coordinated national voter fraud effort in a major election, whether it's by mail or otherwise." 

After most of the major news organizations declared Biden the President-elect on November 7, Trump refused to accept his loss, declaring "this election is far from over" and alleging election fraud without providing evidence. Multiple lawsuits alleging electoral fraud were filed by the Trump campaign, all of which were dismissed as having no merit. Republican officials questioned the legitimacy of the election and aired conspiracy theories regarding various types of alleged fraud. In early 2021, motivated by the claims of widespread voter fraud and the resulting legitimacy crisis among the Republican base, GOP lawmakers in a number of states initiated a push to make voting laws more restrictive.
At least four cases involving allegations of, and convictions for, voter fraud in favor of Donald Trump emerged in April 2021. In April 2021, Barry Morphew of Colorado admitted to FBI agents that he cast a ballot in November 2020 in favor of Trump in the name of his missing wife. In a further twist, in May 2021, he was charged with murdering his wife, who had disappeared in May 2020. Also in April 2021, Bruce Bartman of Pennsylvania was convicted of voter fraud charges after he cast a ballot for Trump in the name of his dead mother. As of April 30, 2021, two other Pennsylvanians had criminal cases pending regarding accusations of voter fraud by casting illegal ballots for Donald Trump.

Another case of voter fraud in favor of Donald Trump emerged from Nevada. In October 2021, Republican Donald Kirk Hartle of Nevada was charged with two felony counts of voter fraud, one for voting twice and one that he forged his deceased wife's name to vote with her ballot. Nevada law calls for all registered voters to receive a mail-in ballot. Election officials discovered that a ballot was received from the deceased but still registered Rosemarie Hartle. A few days after the election of November 2020, Donald Hartle told election investigators that his wife's ballot never came to the house. While Rosemary Hartle's ballot was illegally cast by a Republican, the story was used by Tucker Carlson on Fox News to support claims of voter fraud by Democrats.

By 2021, there were 510 pending election fraud offenses against 43 defendants and 386 active election fraud investigations, in the state of Texas alone.

References

Sources

 

Electoral fraud in the United States